Arizona Annie, also known as The Arizona Girl, is a fictional Old West female gunslinger appearing in American comic books published by Marvel Comics. She debuted in Wild West #1 (Spring 1948) and was created by Syd Shores.

Fictional character biography
In her earlier days, Arizona Annie and her boyfriend Slim Smith were having the horseshoes on their horses reshoed by a woman-hating blacksmith named Pete Grimm who wouldn't work on Annie's horse. Later that night, he was robbed which led to Arizona Annie apprehending the criminal. Pete then withdrew his negative comments towards Annie. Then she exposed a land developer named Josiah Cleek who was doing a shoddy operation of Sterling Wells.

When Annie was accused of being the leader of a gang due to them being led by a woman, Annie later discovered that it was a criminal named Pretty Face Grimes who was dressed in drag. Annie apprehended the gang and exposed Grimes. At the time when she was being pressured into covering for the previous teacher until a new one can be found, Annie apprehended the bank robbers that tried to hide in the school where she accidentally arrested the new teacher in the process.

Slim and his friends later made a joke that Annie was in love with an outlaw named Grizzly Williams. This was proven false when Annie defeated Grizzly Williams.

Annie later took part in politics when Slim egged her into doing something that a man can do. While she did win an election, she discovered that the local dog catcher had tricked her into running. Annie had Slim and the mayor paraded around in the dog catcher's carriage.

Annie later visited a carnival where the owners of a shooting gallery have rigged it. Afterwards, she worked as a teacher again after the last one got married. At some point, she and Slim went their separate ways.

During the late 19th century, Annie had left Slim and developed a love relationship with Kid Colt. The two of them visited the town of Wilcox where they find that its citizens are actually Skrulls in disguise. Upon the Skrulls being exposed, Annie and Kid Colt drove them out of them where some of them were killed during the confrontation.

Powers and abilities
Arizona Annie is an expert at armed combat.

Equipment
Arizona Annie is known to wield colt revolvers and a rifle in battle.

In other media
Arizona Annie appears in Lego Marvel Super Heroes 2, voiced by Melli Bond. At the time when the Guardians of the Galaxy were in the Old West part of Chronopolis, she and Kid Colt help Star-Lord rescue Rocket Raccoon and Groot from a circus train run by the local version of the Circus of Crime that Arizona Annie and Kid Colt were pursuing.

References

External links
 Arizona Annie at Marvel Wiki
 

Comics characters introduced in 1948
Marvel Comics female characters
Marvel Comics Western (genre) characters
Western (genre) gunfighters